Madannapet is a locality in Hyderabad, Telangana, India.

Commercial area
There are many shops and a big vegetable market called as Madannapet mandi, which is quite popular among people of surrounding suburbs.

There is also a popular fish market situated near the vegetable market at the third gate. Many people visit and buy the fresh fish and sea food. It is crowded on Sundays.

An old Eidgahs (recognized by TS Wakf Board) is in this area.

Transport
TSRTC connects Madannapet with all parts of the city.

The closest MMTS Train station is at Yakutpura.

References

Neighbourhoods in Hyderabad, India